Aslı Ağırbaş is an architect. She is known for her futuristic works.

References

Turkish architects
Turkish women
Year of birth missing (living people)
Living people
Women architects